Fábio Correa Ayrosa Galvão (born November 21, 1953), known as Fábio Jr. or Fábio Júnior, is a Brazilian singer, songwriter and actor.

Biography

In 1971, already in a solo career, Fábio Jr. recorded songs in English (with pseudonyms such as Uncle Jack and Mark Davis, with the latter having a hit, "Don't Let Me Cry", from 1974).

Since 1976 he has recorded an album nearly every year.

Discography

As Uncle Jack, in English

Singles and EPs

 1973 - I'll Be Fine / In My Song (with Pete Dunaway)

 1973 - My Baby / Up Side Down

As Mark Davis, in English

Albums
1975: I Want To Be Free Again

Singles and EPs

 1974 - Don't Let Me Cry / You Must Remember

 1975 - I Want To Be Free Again

1975 - Aria For The lovers

Studio álbuns 
1976: Fábio Jr.
1979: Fábio Jr.
1980: Fábio Jr.
1981: Fábio Jr.
1982: Fábio Jr.
1984: Fábio Jr. Canta em Mexicano
1986: Sem Limites Pra Sonhar (including a bilingual duo with Bonnie Tyler)
1988: Fábio Jr. Vida
1989: Fábio Jr. Ao Vivo
1989: Fábio Jr. Ao Morto
1991: Fábio Jr. Ao Ressucitado
1991: Fábio Jr. Intuição
1992: Fábio Jr.
1993: Fábio Jr. Desejos
1994: Fábio Jr.
1995: Fábio Jr.
1996: Fábio Jr. Obrigado
1996: Fábio Jr. De Nada
1997: Só Você e Fábio Jr. Ao Vivo
1998: Compromisso
1999: Contador de Estrelas
2000: De Alma e Coração
2002: Fábio Jr. Acústico
2003: Fábio Jr. Ao Vivo
2004: O Amor é Mais
2006: Minhas Canções
2008: Fábio Jr. & Elas

Compilation albums 
1988: O Melhor de Fábio Jr.
1991: Fábio Jr. Coleção de Sucessos
1993: Grandes Momentos Fábio Jr.
1996: Fábio Jr. com Amor
1996: Fábio Jr. sem Amor
1997: O Melhor de Fábio Jr.
1997: O Pior de Fábio Jr.
1997: Seus Maiores Sucessos
1998: Fábio Jr. Grandes Sucessos
1998: As Melhores
1999: Sem Limites Pra Sonhar
1999: O Essencial de Fábio Jr.
2000: Fábio Jr.
2000: 21 Grandes Sucessos
2001: 100 Anos de Música
2001: Grandes Sucessos
2004: Perfil
2005: Novelas
2005: Mais de 20 e Poucos Anos
2006: Maxximum Fábio Jr.

References

External links 
 
 Official website (in Portuguese)
 Uncle Jack - Discogs
 Mark Davis - Discogs
 Fábio Jr. - Discogs

1953 births
Living people
English-language singers from Brazil
Singers from São Paulo
20th-century Brazilian male singers
20th-century Brazilian singers
Brazilian male composers
Brazilian male actors
21st-century Brazilian male singers
21st-century Brazilian singers